Pawłowo  is a village in the administrative district of Gmina Gardeja, within Kwidzyn County, Pomeranian Voivodeship, in northern Poland.

For the history of the region, see History of Pomerania.

The village has a population of 150.

Notable residents
 Wilhelm Sebastian von Belling, (1719-1779), general

References

Villages in Kwidzyn County